Eois canariata is a moth in the family Geometridae. It is found in Ecuador.

References

Moths described in 1903
Eois
Moths of South America